Charles "Chuck" Koen (1945 – July 20, 2018) was an African-American minister and civil rights activist from Cairo, Illinois who served as prime minister of the Black Liberators and the executive directors of the Black United Front Cairo. Koen worked with organizations in Southern Illinois during the mid- and late 1960s. He founded the Black Liberators in St. Louis, Missouri in 1968; he later went on to lead nationally noted campaigns in Cairo, Illinois, most notably a boycott of white owned businesses. During his Cairo struggles, Koen was honored with a tribute on an album by jazz drummer Max Roach.

Koen was the subject of the FBI's Counter Intelligence Program (COINTELPRO), an infiltration program sanctioned by FBI Chief J. Edgar Hoover and President Richard M. Nixon against Black activists and activist groups in the 1960s and 1970s. Targets of this scheme were individuals and groups such as Martin Luther King Jr., Malcolm X, H. Rap Brown, Koen, Medgar Evers, the Black Panthers, the Black Liberators and others. The essence of this FBI ploy was to cause division in and amongst Black leadership to prevent organization and unity in the black and poor communities around the nation. Those who were not killed or were not successfully infiltrated were constant subjects of criminal arrests and indictments.

References

1945 births
2018 deaths
Activists for African-American civil rights
People convicted of making false statements
People from St. Louis
COINTELPRO targets
Activists from St. Louis
African-American activists
African-American history of Missouri
21st-century African-American people